The 22125 / 26 Nagpur–Amritsar AC Superfast Express is a Superfast Express train of the AC Express series belonging to Indian Railways – Central Railway zone that runs between  and  in India.

It operates as train number 22125 from Nagpur Junction to Amritsar Junction and as train number 22126 in the reverse direction, serving the states of Maharashtra, Madhya Pradesh, Uttar Pradesh, Delhi, Haryana & Punjab.

Coaches

The 22125 / 26 Nagpur–Amritsar AC Superfast Express has 9 AC 3 tier, 4 AC 2 Tier, 1 AC 1st Class & 2 End-on Generator Coaches. It doesn't carry a pantry car.

As is customary with most train services in India, coach composition may be amended at the discretion of Indian Railways depending on demand.

 EOG consists of Luggage and Generator coach
 B consists of AC 3 Tier coach
 PC consists of Pantry car coach
 A consists of AC 2 Tier coach
 H consists of First Class AC coach

Service

As the average speed of the train is above , as per Indian Railways rules, its fare includes a Superfast Express surcharge.

Routeing

Traction

As the route is fully electrified, a Ajni-based WAP-7 locomotive powers the train up to its destination.

Operation

22125 Nagpur–Amritsar AC Superfast Express leaves Nagpur Junction every Saturday & arriving Amritsar Junction the next day.
22126 Amritsar–Nagpur AC Superfast Express leaves Amritsar Junction every Monday &  arriving Nagpur Junction the next day.

References

External links
22125 AC Superfast Express at India Rail Info
22126 AC Superfast Express at India Rail Info

Transport in Nagpur
Transport in Amritsar
AC Express (Indian Railways) trains
Rail transport in Maharashtra
Rail transport in Madhya Pradesh
Rail transport in Uttar Pradesh
Rail transport in Haryana
Rail transport in Delhi
Rail transport in Punjab, India